The Alex Fraser Bridge (also known as the Annacis Bridge) is a cable-stayed bridge over the Fraser River that connects Richmond and New Westminster with North Delta in Greater Vancouver, British Columbia. The bridge is named for Alex Fraser (1916 – 1989), a former British Columbia Minister of Transportation. The bridge was the longest cable-stayed bridge in the world when it opened on September 22, 1986, and was the longest in North America until the Arthur Ravenel Jr. Bridge, in the U.S. state of South Carolina opened in 2005.

H==Overview==
It consists of seven lanes, three in each direction with the middle lane acting as a counterflow lane, and had a maximum speed limit of 90 km per hour until July 24, 2019 when the speed limit was lowered to 70 km/h to accommodate the additional counterflow lane. Upon opening in 1986, only four of the six available lanes were open. Cyclists and pedestrians share two narrow sidewalks one on each side. All six lanes opened in 1987 after traffic demand justified the need.

The bridge's southern end is in North Delta and its northern end is on Delta's Annacis Island.  Connections on its southern end lead to Blaine, Washington and to White Rock.  The connections on the northern end lead into the cities of New Westminster, Richmond, and Burnaby, and on into Vancouver itself.  It is a major artery in the Lower Mainland of British Columbia.

The bridge was constructed for the British Columbia Ministry of Transportation and was designed by a joint venture of Klohn Crippen Berger and Buckland & Taylor (Now COWI North America). Its total cost was $58 million.

Recent history
In December 2016, the Alex Fraser Bridge along with the Port Mann Bridge dropped "ice bombs," also called "slush bombs" on vehicles causing damage to windshields.  The Alex Fraser has the cables along the sides of the driving lanes where as the Port Mann has them cross over-top of the driving lanes. In addition to 2016, this also happened on the Alex Fraser in 2005, 2008, and 2012. The Alex Fraser needed to be closed a few times during December 2016 due to the possibility of ice bombs; this caused major traffic problems in the region. To combat this issue, the BC Government announced that a heavy lift helicopter will be used to blow snow and ice off the cables to prevent it from accumulating and falling onto the cars below.

An announcement was made on January 19, 2017, that a new seventh travel lane will be added on the bridge by slightly narrowing the existing lanes and removing the shoulders. A counterflow system with movable barrier was added to help ease traffic during morning and afternoon rush hours. The new seventh lane opened to traffic on September 14, 2019, with the moveable reversible zipper in operation on December 16, 2019.

See also
 List of crossings of the Fraser River
 List of bridges in Canada

References

Bridges in Greater Vancouver
Cable-stayed bridges in Canada
Bridges completed in 1986
Buildings and structures in Delta, British Columbia
Bridges over the Fraser River
1986 in Canada
Road bridges in British Columbia
Roads with a reversible lane
Transport in Delta, British Columbia